The 70-episode Cardcaptor Sakura Japanese anime television series is based on the manga series written and illustrated by the manga artist group Clamp. Cardcaptor Sakura is directed by Morio Asaka and animated and produced by Madhouse. The series focuses on Sakura Kinomoto, a fourth-grade elementary school student who discovers that she possesses magical powers after accidentally freeing a set of magical cards from the book in which they had been sealed for years. She is tasked with retrieving those cards in order to avoid an unknown catastrophe from befalling the world.

The episodes are spread over three seasons: the first season contained 35 episodes aired between April and December 1998, the second season contained 11 episodes aired between April and June 1999, and the third season contained 24 episodes aired between September 1999 and March 2000. The series was released by Bandai Visual to 18 VHS, LD and DVD compilation volumes between September 1998 and May 2000. Two Blu-ray Disc box set volumes were released by Geneon, one in March 2009 containing the first two seasons, and the second in June 2009 containing the third season. Three short, bonus original video animation (OVA) episodes were released with the first-print, limited edition versions of the VHS, LD and DVD releases.

Cardcaptor Sakura was initially licensed for the English-speaking market by Nelvana, which dubbed the full series into English and released it under the name Cardcaptors. In the US, the series only ran for 39 episodes, which were heavily edited and re-ordered. Geneon USA/Pioneer Family Entertainment released dubbed Cardcaptors episodes to nine VHS and DVD compilation volumes between November 2000 and July 2002. Pioneer Entertainment also released the uncut, unedited Cardcaptor Sakura series in its original Japanese form, with English subtitles to 18 DVD compilation volumes between November 2000 and November 2003. Pioneer also contracted with Nelvana to release the dubbed episodes. The Cardcaptor Sakura TV series DVDs went out-of-print at the end of 2006 when the license expired. Madman Entertainment released Cardcaptor Sakura in its uncut form in two DVD collection boxes in September 2012 and November 2012. NIS America re-released the entire series on DVD and Blu-ray in August 2014, featuring Japanese audio and an unedited English dub.

Episode list
Cardcaptor Sakura is directed by Morio Asaka and animated and produced by Madhouse. Art direction is handled by Katsufumi Hariu and character design is done by Kumiko Takahashi. The chief writer for the series is Nanase Ohkawa of Clamp. The music is composed by Takayuki Negishi, with sound direction by Masafumi Mima.

The series contains 70 episodes spread over three seasons. Each episode title contains the word , representing the name of the protagonist of this series, Sakura Kinomoto. The first season, consisting of 35 episodes, aired between April 7 and December 29, 1998 on Japanese satellite television channel NHK BS2. The second season, with 11 episodes, aired between April 6 and June 22, 1999. The third season, containing 24 episodes, aired between September 7, 1999 and March 21, 2000. The episodes were later released by Bandai Visual to 18 VHS, LD and DVD compilation volumes, each containing four episodes, though the first and twelfth volumes contain three episodes. The VHS/LD volumes were released between September 25, 1998 and May 25, 2000. The DVD volumes were released between September 25, 1999 and May 25, 2000. Six volumes of an abridged selection of the series titled Cardcaptor Sakura TV Series Selection were released on VHS between April 25 and June 25, 2001, containing 12 episodes. Three DVD box set volumes were released between April 1 and August 10, 2005 by Geneon Universal Entertainment. Two Blu-ray Disc box set volumes were released by Geneon, one on March 27, 2009 containing the first two seasons, and the second on June 26, 2009 containing the third season.

Three short, bonus original video animation (OVA) episodes were released with the first-print, limited edition versions of the VHS, LD and DVD releases. The first episode was released with volume one of the VHS and LD releases on September 25, 1998. The second episode came with volume ten of the VHS, LD and DVD releases on September 25, 1999. The third episode, also released on September 25, 1999, was with volume one of the DVD release.

Cardcaptor Sakura was initially licensed for the English-language market by Nelvana, which dubbed the series into English and released it under the name Cardcaptors. For the US broadcast, the heavily edited episodes were also reordered, with many left out completely. Although all 70 episodes (as well as the first film) were dubbed, in the US the series only ran for 39 episodes, changing the original episode order but finishing with the show's actual final episode. Potentially controversial material was removed, and the series was refocused to be more action-oriented to try to appeal to male viewers, as they were seen as the largest audience of animation at the time. Cardcaptors first aired in the United States on Kids' WB between June 17, 2000 and December 14, 2001. In the Kids' WB broadcast, the first episode aired was "Sakura's Rival", the eighth episode of the series, having removed episodes focusing on Sakura and to have the show start with Syaoran Li's arrival. In Nelvana's airing of the series in the United Kingdom in 2001 on Nickelodeon and CITV, the skipped episodes were restored, but other edits remained. The Cardcaptors dub, including the episodes skipped in the US broadcast, also aired in Australia on Network Ten and Cartoon Network (with an English cover of the first opening theme instead of the American one), in Ireland on RTÉ Network 2, and in Nelvana's native Canada on Teletoon (which also aired the episodes with a French dub on Télétoon). Animax created an English dub of the series as well, which it broadcast on its English-language networks in Southeast Asia and South Asia. The series was broadcast under its original name in Latin America and Spain.

Pioneer Entertainment released the first 27 US Cardcaptors episodes to nine VHS and DVD compilation volumes between November 14, 2000 and July 9, 2002; a planned tenth volume was cancelled in June 2002. It also released the unedited Cardcaptor Sakura series, with the original Japanese audio tracks and English subtitles, to 18 DVD compilation volumes between November 14, 2000 and November 11, 2003; the first 11 volumes were also released in VHS. Pioneer also contracted with Nelvana to release the dubbed episodes. The Cardcaptor Sakura TV series DVDs went out-of-print at the end of 2006 when the license expired. NIS America has licensed the Cardcaptor Sakura TV series and re-released the entire series with Japanese and unedited English audio on DVD and Blu-ray on August 5, 2014.

Madman Entertainment licensed the original Cardcaptor Sakura episodes in its uncut form with Japanese audio and English subtitles, and later released the series in two DVD box collections, one consisting of season one and the other consisting of seasons two and three. Each DVD box set contained the textless openings and endings of the series; the second DVD box set also contained an exclusive interview with Sakura Tange, Sakura Kinomoto's voice actress. The first DVD box collection was released in September 2012, and the second DVD box collection was released in November 2012.

Two pieces of theme music are used for each season: one opening theme and one ending theme. For the first season, the opening theme is "Catch You Catch Me" by Gumi, and the ending theme is "Groovy!" by Kohmi Hirose. For the third season, the opening theme is "Platinum" by Maaya Sakamoto, and the ending theme is "Fruits Candy" by Megumi Kojima. The Cardcaptors English adaptation replaces the Japanese theme songs with an original song created for the adaptation, "Cardcaptors Theme", except in some countries such as Australia where the opening is the Japanese theme with English lyrics. In France and the United Kingdom, "Razzmatazz" by Froggy Mix is used for the second and third seasons. Eight insert theme songs are also used throughout Cardcaptor Sakura and are played during the episodes.

Season 1 (1998)

Season 2 (1999)

Season 3 (1999–2000)

Specials

Films

Notes

References

Episodes
Lists of anime episodes